The Paralympic Committee of Montenegro (Montenegrin: Параолимпијски комитет Црне Горе / Paraolimpijski komitet Crne Gore) is the National Paralympic Committee in Montenegro for the Paralympic Games movement. It is a non-profit organisation that selects teams, and raises funds to send Montenegrin competitors to Paralympic events organised by the International Paralympic Committee (IPC).

History 
The Paralympic Committee of Montenegro was founded in May 2007. by renaming the Association for Sports and Recreation of the Disabled of Montenegro.

See also 
Montenegro at the Paralympics

References

External links 
Official website

National Paralympic Committees
Paralympic
Montenegro at the Paralympics
Sports organizations established in 2007
2007 establishments in Montenegro